Fergani is a surname of North African, particularly Algerian, origin. People with that surname include:

 Ali Fergani (born 1952), Algerian footballer and manager
 Mohamed Tahar Fergani (born 1928), Algerian singer, violinist and composer
 Salim Fergani (born 1953), Algerian oud player and singer

See also 
 Farghānī (disambiguation), a surname of Persian origin